The Meralco Bolts first participated in the Philippine Basketball Association (PBA) Draft on August 29, 2010, one month before their first PBA season. The Bolts bought the original franchise of the Sta. Lucia Realtors in 2010 when Sta. Lucia disbanded after the  season. Meralco received the rights for all of the Sta. Lucia's players and draftees. As an incentive of being a new franchise, the PBA Board of Governors gave Meralco the 11th overall pick.

Shawn Weinstein became the team's first draft choice, the 10th pick in the 2010 PBA Draft (draft pick was acquired via trade with the Alaska Aces).

Selections

Notes
1.All players entering the draft are Filipinos until proven otherwise.

References

Philippine Basketball Association draft